Hafiz Gul Bahadur (born c.1961) is the leader of a Pakistani Taliban faction based in North Waziristan.  Upon the formation of the Tehrik-i-Taliban Pakistan (TTP) in December 2007, he was announced as the militant group's overall naib amir under Baitullah Mehsud, who was based in South Waziristan, but has largely distanced himself from the TTP due to rivalries with Mehsud and disagreements about the TTP's attacks against the Pakistani state.

Background
Gul Bahadur, a direct descendant of Mirzali Khan, is a member of the Madda Khel clan of the Uthmanzai Waziris. Educated in a Deobandi madrassa located in Multan, he is affiliated with the Jamiat Ulema-e-Islam-Fazal (JUI-F) political party.

Gul Bahadur fought in Afghanistan during the Soviet–Afghan War and later during the rule of the Taliban. In August 2001 he recruited about 4,000 volunteers to oppose the proposed placement of United Nations monitors, who were to prevent the flow of weapons from Pakistan to Afghanistan. Gul Bahadur objected because the monitors would have hampered the ability of Pakistani Pushtuns to support the Afghan Taliban against the Northern Alliance. (The volunteer militia was never deployed, however, due in part to repercussions of the 9/11 attacks).

Hafiz Gul Bahadur is closely allied with Sirajuddin Haqqani and provides him with a rear base in North Waziristan. Anti-American Taliban are headed by Gul Bahadur and Haqqani network.

Activities
In 2005 the Pakistani military began operations within North Waziristan to pursue foreign, mainly al-Qaeda, militants fleeing from South Waziristan.  They met resistance from militant groups led by Hafiz Gul Bahadur, among others.

In September 2006 he negotiated a peace deal with the Pakistani military in which he agreed to expel all foreign militants, such as al-Qaeda and Uzbek militants, from Pakistani soil.

After a year of fighting US-led forces in Afghanistan, he returned to Pakistan in late 2007. In December he joined Baitullah Mehsud's Tehrik-e Taliban Pakistan (TTP) as its first deputy leader.  Gul Bahadur attempted to distance himself from the TTP after the group began to attack government forces.  Although no formal announcement of leaving the TTP occurred, Gul Bahadur often refused to coordinate activities with the TTP against the government.  During late 2007 and early 2008, Bahadur refused to assist Baitullah Mehsud against the Pakistani Army and urged him to refrain from fighting Pakistani forces in Razmak, North Waziristan.

In July 2008 Gul Bahadur and Maulvi Nazir, leader of the Ahmedzai Wazirs in South Waziristan, announced the creation of the Muqami Tehrik-e Taliban, translated as the Local Taliban Movement and also referred to as the "Waziri Alliance", with Gul Bahadur as its leader and Nazir as his deputy.

In late 2008 missile strikes from U.S. drones in North Waziristan strained the peace deal with Islamabad that he had agreed previously to observe in 2006.  In March 2011 he threatened to pull out of the peace deal with Pakistani government after one of his top commanders Sherabat Khan Wazir was killed in Datta Khel airstrike.

Airstrikes targeted Hafiz Gul Bahadur group
In 2014 conflicting reports suggest that air strikes conducted in Datta Khel Tehsil of North Waziristan Agency have killed key commanders of the Hafiz Gul Bahadur group including Gul Bahadur.

See also
Drone attacks in Pakistan
War in North-West Pakistan

References

External links
 Waziristan and Mughal empire
 Nehru in Waziristan
 Sketch map of Waziristan
 Mehsuds and Wazirs, the King-makers in a game of thrones
 Lawrence of Arabia in Waziristan

Taliban leaders
Tehrik-i-Taliban Pakistan members
Living people
Pashtun people
People from North Waziristan
1961 births